Elizabethtown is a census-designated place (CDP) in Whitewater Township, Hamilton County, Ohio, United States. The population was 323 at the 2020 census.

History
Elizabethtown was platted in 1817 by Isaac Mills, and named for his wife. It was a depot on the Cleveland, Cincinnati, Chicago and St. Louis Railway. In 1894, Elizabethtown was described as having three stores, two churches and a grain elevator.

Geography
U.S. Route 50 runs through the center of the community, and Interstate 275 passes it to the northwest but does not provide direct access to it.

References

Census-designated places in Hamilton County, Ohio
Census-designated places in Ohio
1817 establishments in Ohio